Billings County is a county in the U.S. state of North Dakota. As of the 2020 census, the population was 945, making it the second-least populous county in North Dakota. Its county seat and only incorporated place is Medora.

The Territorial legislature authorized Billings County on February 10, 1879, naming it for Northern Pacific Railway president Frederick H. Billings. It was organized on May 4, 1886. The original county boundary was significantly altered since its creation, by actions in 1883, 1885, 1887, 1896, 1901 and 1904. Its most significant alterations came in 1907 (Bowman County partitioned off), 1912 (Golden Valley County partitioned off), and 1914 (Slope County partitioned off).

Geography
The Little Missouri River flows northward through the western portion of the county. Bullion Creek flows eastward into the southwestern corner of the county to discharge into the Little Missouri River.

Billings County terrain consists of rugged semi-arid hills in its western portion, giving way to more level ground in the east. The terrain slopes to the east and south, with its highest terrain along its west boundary line, at 2,523' (769m) ASL.

The South Unit of Theodore Roosevelt National Park lies in the central part of the county, just north of Medora.

Major highways
  Interstate 94
  U.S. Highway 85

Adjacent counties

 McKenzie County – north
 Dunn County – northeast
 Stark County – east
 Slope County – south
 Golden Valley County – west

Protected areas
 Little Missouri National Grassland (part)
 Sully Creek State Park
 Theodore Roosevelt National Park (South Unit)

Demographics

2000 census
As of the 2000 census, there were 888 people, 366 households, and 255 families in the county. The population density was 0.79 people per square mile (0.31/km2). There were 529 housing units at an average density of 0.45 per square mile (0.18/km2). The racial makeup of the county was 98.96% White, 0.11% Native American, 0.11% Pacific Islander, 0.11% from other races, and 0.70% from two or more races. 0.34% of the population were Hispanic or Latino of any race. 44.2% were of German, 17.5% Ukrainian, 8.2% Norwegian and 5.4% Irish ancestry.

There were 366 households, out of which 29.2% had children under the age of 18 living with them, 62.6% were married couples living together, 4.4% had a female householder with no husband present, and 30.1% were non-families. 26.8% of all households were made up of individuals, and 7.7% had someone living alone who was 65 years of age or older. The average household size was 2.43 and the average family size was 2.95.

The county population contained 24.9% under the age of 18, 4.5% from 18 to 24, 26.6% from 25 to 44, 28.0% from 45 to 64, and 16.0% who were 65 years of age or older. The median age was 42 years. For every 100 females there were 112.9 males. For every 100 females age 18 and over, there were 112.4 males.

The median income for a household in the county was $32,667, and the median income for a family was $35,750. Males had a median income of $32,500 versus $21,000 for females. The per capita income for the county was $16,186. About 10.7% of families and 12.8% of the population were below the poverty line, including 11.0% of those under age 18 and 12.8% of those age 65 or over.

2010 census
As of the 2010 census, there were 783 people, 358 households, and 223 families in the county. The racial makeup of the county was 98.6% white, 0.5% Asian, 0.4% American Indian, 0.3% black or African American, 0.1% from other races, and 0.1% from two or more races. Those of Hispanic or Latino origin made up 0.5% of the population. In terms of ancestry, 40.6% were German, 19.1% were Ukrainian, 17.7% were Norwegian, 9.3% were Irish, 7.4% were Russian, 5.0% were English, and 0.9% were American.

Of the 358 households, 19.0% had children under the age of 18 living with them, 56.1% were married couples living together, 1.7% had a female householder with no husband present, 37.7% were non-families, and 33.2% of all households were made up of individuals. The average household size was 2.16 and the average family size was 2.72. The median age was 48.6 years.

The median income for a household in the county was $51,923 and the median income for a family was $61,250. Males had a median income of $46,806 versus $31,250 for females. The per capita income for the county was $28,666. About 6.8% of families and 8.3% of the population were below the poverty line, including 11.9% of those under age 18 and 4.5% of those age 65 or over.

Population by decade

Politics
Billings County voters have been traditionally Republican. In each of the last five elections (as of 2020) the Republican candidate has received over seventy percent of the county's vote. However, it has some third party or independent interest. Billings county gave Ross Perot over twenty percent of the vote in his 1992 and 1996 campaigns. It gave Pat Buchanan approximately six percent when he ran as the Reform Party's candidate in 2000.

Recreation
The Bully Pulpit Golf Course is located three miles south of Medora and the Maah Daah Hey Trail single track non-motorized trail starts 30 miles south of Medora.

Communities

City
 Medora (county seat)

Unorganized Territories
There are no townships in Billings County, but the United States Census Bureau divides the county into two unorganized territories:
 North Billings, which consists of all of the county north of I-94, had a population of 566 at the 2020 Census.
 South Billings, which consists of all of the county south of I-94 outside Medora, had a population of 258 at the 2020 Census.

Unincorporated communities

 Fairfield
 Gorham
 Fryburg
 Sully Springs

See also
 National Register of Historic Places listings in Billings County, North Dakota

Notes

References

External links
 Billings County map, North Dakota DOT

 
Dickinson, North Dakota micropolitan area
1886 establishments in Dakota Territory
Populated places established in 1886